Fast Track is an American action drama television series created by Gary Markowitz, and executive produced by Larry Gelbart and Markowitz, which starred Keith Carradine. It aired on Showtime between August 1997 and March 1998, and was cancelled after one season.

Plot 
Set in the world of NASCAR stock car racing, the show follows orthopedic surgeon and former racing driver Richard Beckett (Keith Carradine) who is hired to be the track doctor of Eagle Ridge Speedway by its owner, Christian Chandler Jr. (Duncan Regehr). Chandler's unhappy wife Nicole (Guylaine St. Onge) is Beckett's former lover, while Chandler's younger sister Mimi (Brandy Ledford), a lawyer, would like to be Beckett's current lover.

Cast 
 Keith Carradine as Dr. Richard Beckett
 Duncan Regehr as Christian Chandler Jr.
 Brandy Ledford as Mimi Chandler
 Guylaine St. Onge as Nicole Chandler
 Tristan Rogers as Harry
 Randy J. Goodwin as Kennedy Winslow
 Jenny Cooper as Wendy Servine
 Michael Copeman as Darrel Butts
 Marc Daniel as Nando
 Sebastian Spence as Stevie Servine
 Fred Williamson as Lowell Carter

Episodes

Production 
The series was filmed in Toronto, Canada, and many of the show's actors, and all of the show's episode directors, were Canadian.

Reception 
Caryn James of The New York Times was unimpressed with the series, stating "There's not much Mr. Carradine can do with such silliness except ratchet his acting up a few notches."

References

External links 
 
 

1997 American television series debuts
1998 American television series endings
1990s American drama television series
Showtime (TV network) original programming
English-language television shows